The Matrimonial Causes Act 1907 was an Act of the Parliament of the United Kingdom that consolidated previous legislation relating to maintenance payments to separated and divorced women. It was designed in response to one cause of poverty amongst mothers and their children, marriage break-up. Support for the "endowment of motherhood" was also increased.

Notes

United Kingdom Acts of Parliament 1907
Divorce law in the United Kingdom